Kaloyan Kopchev (born 22 June 1975) is a former Bulgarian football midfielder who is currently the director of the Health Insurance Fund in Ruse.

Biography

In the 1990s and early 2000s, Kopchev played for Dunav Ruse. In 1999, he earned a Master's in "Marketing and Planning" from the Tsenov Academy of Economics.

References

1975 births
Living people
Sportspeople from Ruse, Bulgaria
Association football midfielders
Bulgarian footballers
FC Dunav Ruse players
Second Professional Football League (Bulgaria) players